Hasan Langi-ye Bala (also Romanized as Ḩasan Langī-ye Bālā; also known as Gazakī-ye Ḩasanlangī) is a village in Shamil Rural District, Takht District, Bandar Abbas County, Hormozgan Province, Iran. At the 2006 census, its population was 1,739, in 375 families.

References 

Populated places in Bandar Abbas County